Shyam K. Goel is a Bollywood script writer.

Filmography
 Lucky Kabootar (2014)
 Kal Kissne Dekha (2009)
 36 China Town (2006)
 Aitraaz (2004)
 Baaz: A Bird in Danger (2003)
 Humraaz (2003)
 Chori Chori Chupke Chupke (2001)
 Baadshah (1999)
 Soldier (1998)
 Maharaja (1998)

External links
 

Indian male screenwriters
Living people
Year of birth missing (living people)
Place of birth missing (living people)
Hindi screenwriters